Verbist is a surname. Notable people with the surname include:

Bram Verbist (born 1983), Belgian footballer
Christopher Verbist (born 1991), Belgian footballer
Evert Verbist (born 1984), Belgian cyclist
Kirsten Verbist (born 1987), Belgian figure skater
Theophiel Verbist (1823–1868), Belgian Roman Catholic priest